Laurent Lanteri (born 2 November 1984) is a French footballer.

Career

Monaco
Lanteri started his career at Monégasque club AS Monaco FC, after played twice at Ligue 1, he went on loan to Ligue 2 club Châteauroux and Metz. At the 2nd half of 2005–06 season he also loaned to Legnano of Serie C2.

Legnano 
In summer 2007, he returned to Legnano now at Serie C1 and in January 2009 he left for fellow third division club Novara.

Novara
Lanteri was signed by Novara in January 2009 for free. He was sent off in his debut. The consequence was suspended two games.

In January 2010 he left for Cisco Roma on loan. Lanteri did not play any game in 2009–10 Lega Pro Prima Divisione. Lanteri played 4 times in 2010–11 Serie B. On 11 January 2011 he left for Casale. On 2 August 2011 he was signed by Foggia.

Siena
On 31 August 2012, Lanteri signed for A.C. Siena, with Francesco Parravicini moving in the opposite direction. Both players were "valued" for €1 million. Lanteri was immediately left for Andria in temporary deal for free. On 22 August 2013, he was signed by Paganese.

Personal life
Lanteri was born in France to parents of Italian descent.

References

External links
Profile at Novara 

Profile at Football.it 

Living people
1984 births
Footballers from Nice
Association football forwards
French footballers
French people of Italian descent
French expatriate footballers
AS Monaco FC players
LB Châteauroux players
A.C. Legnano players
FC Metz players
Novara F.C. players
Atletico Roma F.C. players
Ligue 1 players
Ligue 2 players
Serie B players
Serie C players
Expatriate footballers in Italy